Series 40 of University Challenge began on 5 July 2010 and aired on BBC Two. Below is a list of the matches played with their scores and outcomes.

Results
 Winning teams are highlighted in bold.
 Teams with green scores (winners) returned in the next round, while those with red scores (losers) were eliminated.
 Teams with orange scores must win one more match to return in the next round (current highest scoring losers, teams that won their first quarter final match, teams that won their second quarter final match having lost their first, or teams that won their first quarter final match and lost their second).
 Teams with yellow scores indicate that two further matches must be played and won (teams that lost their first quarter final match).
 A score in italics indicates a match decided on a tie-breaker question.

First round

Highest Scoring Losers play-offs

Second round

Quarter-finals

Semi-finals

Final

 The trophy and title were awarded to the Magdalen team comprising James McComish, Kyle Haddad-Fonda, Matthew Chan and Will Cudmore.
 The trophy was presented by Antony Beevor.

References

External links
 University Challenge Homepage
 Blanchflower Results Table

2011
2010 British television seasons
2011 British television seasons